Brita Appelgren (21 December 1912 – 29 October 1999) was a Swedish film actress.

Selected filmography

 She Is the Only One (1926)
 His English Wife (1927)
 The Blue Mouse (1928)
 Artificial Svensson (1929)
 Love and Champagne (1930)
 Ulla, My Ulla (1930)
 Cavaliers of the Crown (1930)
 Tired Theodore (1931)
 Ship Ahoy! (1931)
 Kanske en gentleman (1935)
 Shipwrecked Max (1936)

References

Bibliography
 Tommy Gustafsson. Masculinity in the Golden Age of Swedish Cinema: A Cultural Analysis of 1920s Films. McFarland, 2014.

External links

1912 births
1999 deaths
Swedish film actresses
Swedish silent film actresses
20th-century Swedish actresses
Actresses from Stockholm